Ronaldinho Gomes (born 22 January 1979) is a Santomean footballer.

International career
Gomes played for the  São Tomé and Príncipe national football team on November 16, 2003 in a World Cup 2006 qualifying match against Libya in Benghazi. The squad lost 0-8.

References

External links

1979 births
Living people
São Tomé and Príncipe footballers
São Tomé and Príncipe international footballers
Association football defenders